Kitts Hill is an unincorporated community in western Lawrence Township, Lawrence County, Ohio, United States.  It has a post office with the ZIP code 45645.  It lies along State Route 141 northeast of the city of Ironton, the county seat of Lawrence County. It has a community center that was previously Deering Local School District in the area. The majority of Pre-K through 12th grade education is provided by the Rock Hill Local School District, although very small portions of the area are served by the Dawson-Bryant Local School District.

Kitts Hill is probably named for the family of farmer Edward Kitts, whose wife Mary bore six daughters and one son in the 1870s.

References

Unincorporated communities in Lawrence County, Ohio
Unincorporated communities in Ohio